Kavlås Castle (Kavlås slott) is a manor house  in Hömbs parish in Tidaholm Municipality in Västra Götaland County, Sweden.

History
Kavlås was first mentioned at the end of the 14th century. Through purchases, the estate came  to the baronial family von Essen  in 1723. The  main building is on three floors and was built between 1750 and 1775 under Fredric Ulric von Essen (1721-1781). The house has elements of both Rococo and Gustavian style.

See also
List of castles in Sweden

References

Buildings and structures in Västra Götaland County